Oxelösund Municipality, Sweden held a municipal election on 19 September 2010 as part of the local elections. This was held on the same day as the general election.

Results
The number of seats remained at 31 with the Social Democrats winning the most at 12, a drop of two from 2006. There were 7,490 valid ballots cast.

Electoral wards
All electoral wards were located within the Oxelösund urban area in a single constituency.

References

Oxelösund
Oxelösund municipal elections